Maid's Night Out is a 1938 American romantic comedy film made by RKO Radio Pictures and starring Joan Fontaine and Allan Lane. It was directed by Ben Holmes from a screenplay by Bert Granet, adapted by from the radio play Certified (also produced by RKO) by Willoughby Speyers.

Plot
Playboy Bill Norman wants to go on a six-month expedition to study tropical fish, but his wealthy businessman father wants him to buckle down and go to work. When Mr. Norman catches Bill trying to "borrow" his yacht, they make a wager. If Bill works for 30 days at the family dairy business without making a single mistake, Mr. Norman will finance his expedition. Norman assumes he will be an executive, but his father makes him deliver milk instead.

On his route, he meets Sheila Harrison, whom he thinks is a maid, but is in fact a socialite. She and her mother are in such deep financial trouble, they cannot pay their bills or their loyal maid Mary. Mrs. Harrison pins her hopes on Sheila marrying wealthy Wally Martin, but Sheila does not like him.

At first, Sheila does not much care for Bill either, but he eventually wins her affections. However, when Sheila is pressured by her mother to break her date with Bill to attend a charity ball with Wally, she encounters Bill there with his beautiful cousin Adele. Wally insists Sheila is his fiancée, and she does not believe Bill's claim that Adele is merely his cousin, so the couple break up.

After Bill is tossed out for punching Wally, Adele overhears Sheila deny she is engaged, and tells Bill. Tim Hogan, a fellow milk deliveryman and friend, drives Bill to Sheila's home to try to speak to her, but the police are called and Bill is arrested.

Hogan manages to convince Sheila that Bill loves her; it also helps when he reveals who Bill actually is. Mary spots them leaving in Hogan's milk truck and assumes Sheila is being kidnapped. The police are alerted. Meanwhile, Sheila puts on a uniform and sets out to deliver the milk on the last day of the bet. Bill gets himself bailed out and catches up with Sheila. Chased by the police, they complete Bill's rounds and return to the dairy with seconds to spare to win the bet. Mr. Norman and Mrs. Harrison recognize each other, and once they figure out what is going on, approve of Bill and Sheila's relationship.

Cast
 Joan Fontaine as Sheila Harrison
 Allan Lane as Bill Norman
 Billy Gilbert as Mr. Papalapoulas, a street vendor of fish whose cart is run into by Wally's car
 Cecil Kellaway as Geoffrey, the Normans' butler
 Hedda Hopper as Mrs. Harrison
 William Brisbane as Wally Martin
 Vicki Lester as Adele
 Hilda Vaughn as Mary
 George Irving as Mr. Norman
 Frank M. Thomas as "Mac" McCarthy
 Solly Ward as Mischa, a communist dairy employee
 Eddie Gribbon as Tim Hogan

References

External links

 

1938 films
1938 romantic comedy films
American romantic comedy films
American black-and-white films
Films directed by Ben Holmes
RKO Pictures films
1930s English-language films
1930s American films